Manual lymphatic drainage (MLD) is a type of massage based on the hypothesis that it will encourage the natural drainage of the lymph, which carries waste products away from the tissues back toward the heart. The lymph system depends on intrinsic contractions of the smooth muscle cells in the walls of lymph vessels (peristalsis) and the movement of skeletal muscles to propel lymph through the vessels to lymph nodes and then to the lymph ducts, which return lymph to the cardiovascular system. Manual lymph drainage uses a specific amount of pressure (less than 9oz per square inch or about 4kPa), and rhythmic circular movements to stimulate lymph flow.

Medical use
Studies show mixed results regarding the efficacy of the method in treating lymphedema, and further studies are needed. A 2013 systematic review of manual lymphatic drainage with regard to breast cancer–related lymphedema found no clear support for the effectiveness of the intervention in either preventing limb edema in at-risk women or treating women for the condition.

History
Manual lymphatic drainage was pioneered by Danish Drs.Emil Vodder and Estrid Vodder in the 1930s for the treatment of chronic sinusitis and other immune disorders. While working on the French Riviera treating patients with chronic colds, the Vodders noticed these patients had swollen lymph nodes. In 1932, at a time when the lymphatic system was poorly understood, they began to develop light, rhythmic hand movements hoping to promote lymph movement. In 1936, they introduced this technique in Paris, France, and after World WarII, they returned to Copenhagen to teach other practitioners to use this therapy.

References

External links
 Explanation of Manual lymphedema therapy on National Cancer Institute.

Alternative medical systems
Massage therapy